The fourth season of That '70s Show, an American television series, began September 25, 2001, and ended on May 21, 2002. It aired on Fox. The region 1 DVD was released on May 9, 2006. This season is set entirely in 1978.

Cast

Main 
Topher Grace as Eric Forman
Mila Kunis as Jackie Burkhart
Ashton Kutcher as Michael Kelso
Danny Masterson as Steven Hyde
Laura Prepon as Donna Pinciotti
Wilmer Valderrama as Fez
Debra Jo Rupp as Kitty Forman
Kurtwood Smith as Red Forman
Don Stark as Bob Pinciotti
Tommy Chong as Leo

Special guest
Wayne Knight as Angel
French Stewart as Daniel
Luke Wilson as Casey Kelso
Christopher Masterson as Todd
Roger Daltrey as Mr. Wilkinson

Special guest appearance
Howard Hesseman as Max

Recurring
Cynthia Lamontagne as Rhonda
Mo Gaffney as Joanne
Kevin McDonald as Pastor Dave

Guest
Jennifer Lyons as Pam Macy
Tom Kenny as Woofy the Dog
Dylan Sprouse as Billy
Cole Sprouse as Bobby
Reagan Gomez-Preston as Melissa
Richard Karn as Theo
Erika Christensen as Stacey
Brittany Daniel as Penny Sigurdson
Timothy Bottoms as Vice Principal Cole
Pamela Sue Martin as Wizard

Special appearance
Lynsey Bartilson as Lynsey
China Chow as China
Colleen Haskell as Colleen
Carnie Wilson as Carnie

Episodes

References 

 That '70s Show Episode Guide at The New York Times

External links 
 
 

2001 American television seasons
2002 American television seasons
Television series set in 1978
4